WLS may refer to:

Arts, entertainment, and media
 WLS (AM), a radio station in Chicago, Illinois, US
 WLS-FM, a radio station in Chicago, Illinois, US
 WLS-TV, a television station in Chicago, Illinois, US
 DWLS, a radio station in Metro Manila, Philippines

Biology and healthcare
 GPR177, Wntless, or WLS, a human gene
 Weight loss surgery

Computing and technology
 Oracle WebLogic Server, a Java application server
 White light scanner, for measuring surface height
 Wavelength shifter, material that absorbs a wavelength and emits another

Other uses
 Wisconsin Lutheran Seminary, US
WLS, the Chapman code for Wales 
 Weighted least squares, in statistics
 West London Synagogue
 Westchester Library System, New York, US